John Hartwell (born c. 1965) is an American college athletics administrator, currently serving as the director of athletics at the University of Louisiana at Monroe. He previously served as athletic director at Utah State University, a position he held from 2015 to 2022.  Hartwell served as the athletic director at Troy University from 2012 to 2015. He is a native of Mobile, Alabama and attended The Citadel.

Hartwell resigned from his position at Utah State in late 2022. He was named athletic director at the University of Louisiana at Monroe on January 26, 2023.

References

External links
 

Year of birth missing (living people)
Living people
American men's basketball players
The Citadel Bulldogs basketball players
Louisiana–Monroe Warhawks athletic directors
Troy Trojans athletic directors
University of Mississippi people
Utah State Aggies athletic directors
Sportspeople from Mobile, Alabama